Therese "Resi" Hammerer (18 February 1925 – 14 June 2010) was an Austrian alpine skier who competed in the 1948 Winter Olympics.

She was born in Mittelberg.

In 1948 she won the bronze medal in the downhill event. In the slalom competition she finished seventh and in the Alpine combined contest she finished twelfth.

External links
 Resi Hammerer's profile at Sports Reference.com
 Resi Hammerer's obituary 

1925 births
2010 deaths
Austrian female alpine skiers
Olympic alpine skiers of Austria
Alpine skiers at the 1948 Winter Olympics
Olympic bronze medalists for Austria
Olympic medalists in alpine skiing
Medalists at the 1948 Winter Olympics
20th-century Austrian women
21st-century Austrian women